Brats on the Beat: Ramones for Kids is a 2006 Ramones cover album, featuring 'kiddified' covers of classic Ramones songs. Songs are performed by members of various punk rock bands. The album was created in order to offer adults an alternative way to introduce children to music, specifically punk rock, through kid friendly Ramones songs that adults can also enjoy.

Track listing
 "Blitzkrieg Bop" – featuring Jim Lindberg of Pennywise
 "Rock 'n' Roll High School" – featuring Matt Skiba of Alkaline Trio
 "California Sun" – featuring Brett Anderson of The Donnas
 "Do You Remember Rock 'n' Roll Radio?" – featuring Greg Attonito of the Bouncing Souls
 "Suzy Is a Headbanger" – featuring Nick Oliveri of Mondo Generator and Queens of the Stone Age
 "Rockaway Beach" – featuring Blag Dahlia of The Dwarves
 "I Just Want to Have Something to Do" – featuring Emily Wynne-Hughes of Go Betty Go
 "Spider-Man theme song" – featuring Ash Guff of Guff
 "We Want the Airwaves" – featuring Spooney of the Gabba Gabba Heys
 "Sheena Is a Punk Rocker" – featuring Josie Cotton
 "Cretin Hop" – featuring Tony Reflex of the Adolescents
 "Bop 'Til You Drop" – featuring Jack Grisham of T.S.O.L.

2006 compilation albums
Go-Kart Records albums
Punk rock compilation albums
Ramones tribute albums